LIAZ 400 series were trucks manufactured in Czech company LIAZ (Czech Republic) in 1996–2003. There are two types - Xena tractor and truck Fox.

Xena 
The first type is a series of tractor Xena. It was introduced in 1996 on an auto show in Hannover. Development began in the 90th years later they come into production as well as other types and gradually replace obsolete 300 series. The Škoda Xena was produced only in version tractor unit 4x2 high cab. There are but modifications to the flatbed 6x2 and 6x2 tipper.

Fox 
Dump truck Škoda Fox came three years later. Large quantities of components are adapted from the previous series, but the chassis, engine and cab are new. Aluminium cabin Škoda Liaz SKL (modular construction LIAZ) is built simple "modular" system to be easy to produce it longer or shorter. Ladder frame, rear tapered dimensions of 850 × 200 × 80. It was made a number of trucks with different superstructures.

Several years after the end of production, the production was resumed by Czech company TEDOM, which produced trucks Fox Tedom D and Tedom G. Fox. The company however produced only about 20 vehicles until 2010.

All trucks Škoda Fox and Fox Tedom are equipped with short cab, chassis configurations were:
- 4x2
- 4x4
- 6x4 (only TEDOM)

References

See also 

Trucks made by LIAZ
Trucks of the Czech Republic